Flanagan is a common surname of Irish origin and an Anglicised version of the Irish name Ó Flannagáin which is derived from the word "flann" meaning 'red' or 'ruddy'.

Origin 
Flanagan is just one variation on the original surname which, according to the 19th century writer Reverend Patrick Woulfe, is:

"...the name of at least five distinct families in different parts of Ireland, viz.:
(1) of Fermanagh, a branch of the Oirghialla, who were chiefs of Tuathratha, now anglicised Toorah, an extensive district in the barony of Magheraboy, in the northwest of Co. Fermanagh, and are still numerous in Ulster and the Co. Mayo; 
2) of Roscommon, a branch of the Sil-Murry and of the same stock as the O'Connors, who were hereditary stewards to the kings of Connacht and chiefs of Clann Chathail, a district which embraced several parishes in the neighbourhood of Elphin; 
3) of Westmeath who were anciently lords of Comair and sometimes of all Teffia;
4) of Ely O'Carroll in the present Offaly, who are of the same stock as the O'Carrolls, and were chiefs of Cinel Arga, a district nearly, if not exactly, co-extensive with the present barony of Ballybrit; and
(5) of Waterford, who were formerly chiefs of Uachtartire, now the barony of Upperthird, in the north-west of Co. Waterford, but were dispossessed by the Powers soon after the Anglo-Norman invasion."

Other variations include Flanagin, Flanigan, Flannigan, Flannaghan, Flannagain, Flaniken, Flenigen and so on. The main reason for this variety is the 'Anglicisation' of many Irish place and fore/surnames as a consequence of the colonisation of Ireland (particularly from the 16th century onward) and the subsequent imposition of the English language. With some exceptions all of these variations may be prefixed with Ó (O') - signifying 'son of' or 'Nic' signifying 'daughter of'.

Prevalance 
As many Irish migrated during the 19th and 20th centuries (especially in the period 1845-1851 to escape the 'Great Famine') the surname can be found in all major English-speaking countries of the world today. Flanagan is the 69th most common name surname in Ireland, 591st most common in Australia, 791st most common in England and the 1,102nd most common in the USA.

Other Information 
Since the late 19th century the Flanagan name is alleged to have both a crest/coat of arms and 'Family motto' associated with it. According to O'Hart's "Irish Pedigrees", Burke's "General Armory," and Fairbairn's "Book of Crests" these include:

Most commonly:
ARMS/CREST: "A mount in base vert an oak tree proper a bordure of the second. A dexter cubit arm in armour proper garnished or and gules holding a flaming sword azure pommel and hilt or."  (An oak tree in leaf growing from a small green mound on a gold coloured shield surrounded by a border of green. The crest is a right forearm clad in armour of natural colour garnished with gold and red. The hand holds a flaming sword with a blue blade and a handle, guard and pommel in gold.

MOTTO: "Certavi et vici" ('I have fought and conquered')

Alternatively (Burke):  Flanagan (Drumdoe, co. Roscommon).
ARMS/CREST: Ar. on a chev. gu. two lions ramp. or. Crest — A hand holding a dagger.

MOTTO: "Audaces fortuna juvat" ('Fortune favours the bold')

People 
 Alex Flanagan, sportscaster
 Anna Flanagan, player Australian field hockey team
 Anthony Flanagan, British actor
 Barry Flanagan, a Welsh sculptor
 Bernard Joseph Flanagan, an American prelate of the Roman Catholic Church
 Bob Flanagan, American writer and performance artist
 Bud Flanagan, English entertainer
 Caitlin Flanagan, writer
 Caroline Flanagan, President of Law Society of Scotland
 Charles Flanagan, politician
 Crista Flanagan, comedian, actress
 David 'Dai' Flanagan, rugby union player
 Dan Flanagan, American judge
 De Witt C. Flanagan, an American Democratic Party politician from New Jersey 
 Edward J. Flanagan, founder of Boys Town
 Ed Flanagan (disambiguation), multiple people
 Fionnula Flanagan, actress
 Fred Flanagan (1924–2013), Australian rules footballer
 Gaynor Flanagan (born 1933), Australian basketball player
 Guy Flanagan, British actor
 Hallie Flanagan, theatre director, producer
 Harley Flanagan, musician
 Helen Flanagan, actress
 Ian Flanagan, tennis player
 Jack Flanagan (disambiguation), multiple people
 Sir Jamie Flanagan, former Chief Constable of the Royal Ulster Constabulary (RUC) 
 John Flanagan (disambiguation), multiple people
 Jon Flanagan, footballer
 Kitty Flanagan, Australian comedian
 Kyle Flanagan (disambiguation), multiple people
 Lauren Flanigan, an American operatic soprano
 Luke 'Ming' Flanagan, Irish politician, MEP
 Maile Flanagan, American actress
 Markus Flanagan, American actor
 Martin Flanagan (journalist), journalist
 Mary Flanagan, American artist, author, educator, and designer
 Matt Flanagan (American football) (born 1995), American football player
 Michael Flanagan (disambiguation), multiple people
 Micky Flanagan, comedian
 Mike Flanagan (disambiguation), multiple people
 Nick Flanagan, Australian golfer
 Nick Flanagan, Irish LGBT+ Activist
 Oliver J. Flanagan, Irish politician
 Owen Flanagan, philosopher
 Patrick Flanagan, inventor
 Paddy Flanagan, cyclist
 Pauline Flanagan, actress
 Peter Flanagan, an English rugby league footballer
 Peter Flanagan (rugby union), Irish-Australian rugby union player
 Ralph Flanagan, a big band leader, conductor, pianist, composer, and arranger for orchestras
 Ralph Flanagan (swimmer), an American competition swimmer
 Richard Flanagan, author, historian, film director
 Roderick Flanagan, journalist, poet, historian
 Sir Ronnie Flanagan, former Chief Constable of the Police Service of Northern Ireland (PSNI) and last Chief Constable of the RUC
 Seán Flanagan, politician
Seán Flanagan, Irish comedian 
 Shalane Flanagan, middle-distance runner
 Shane Flanagan, Australian rugby league football coach
 Steamer Flanagan, baseball player
 Terence Flanagan, an Irish politician
 Terry Flanagan (disambiguation)
 Thomas Flanagan (disambiguation), multiple people
 Tom Flanagan (disambiguation), multiple people
 Tommy Flanagan (actor)
 Tommy Flanagan, jazz pianist
 Vester Flanagan, American news reporter and perpetrator of the Murders of Alison Parker and Adam Ward
 Walt Flanagan, a comic book store manager, reality television personality, podcaster, comic book artist, and songwriter

See also 
 Edith M. Flanigen
 Flanagan (disambiguation)
 Flanagan (model), early page 3 girl
 Flannigan (disambiguation)

References 
 Sloinnte Gaedheal is Gall. Irish Names and Surnames Collected and Edited with explanatory and Historical Notes. Woulfe, Rev. Patrick; Bhulbh, Padraig De, Published by M. H. Gill, Dublin, 1923.
 A Census of Ireland c. 1659. Pender, S (Ed.), Published by Stationery Office, Dublin, 1939. (A presentation of the Irish 'census' conducted by Sir William Petty between 1654 and 1659.)
 Irish Pedigrees; or the origin and stem of the Irish nation, Vols 1 and 2. O'Hart, John. Published by M. H. Gill, Dublin, 1878.
 The general armory of England, Scotland, Ireland, and Wales; comprising a registry of armorial bearings from the earliest to the present time. Burke, Sir John Bernard. Published by Harrison and Sons, London, 1884, pp 503 & 1299.
 Fairbairn's Book Of Crests Of The Families Of Great Britain And Ireland. Fairburn, James. Published by T. C. & E. C. Jack, London, 1905.

External links 
  https://research.ucc.ie/doi/atlas
  https://www.irishmanuscripts.ie/product/a-census-of-ireland-circa-1659/
  https://babel.hathitrust.org/cgi/pt?id=uc2.ark:/13960/t7dr36q7f&view=1up&seq=1&q1=flanagan

Other links 

English-language surnames
Surnames of Irish origin
Anglicised Irish-language surnames